DuoBoots is a women's footwear brand that  pioneered the concept of boots with multiple calf fittings in the 1970s. They remain the only mainstream boot brand offering women a choice of calf and foot sizes in knee-high and over-the-knee boots. The 47-year-old brand has sold over two million pairs of boots to consumers in more than 50 countries. Their boots are handcrafted in Portugal by specialist family-run artisanal factories. 

In 2016, the brand briefly became known as Ted&Muffy, named after the brands original founders, Ted and karthick periyaswamy, who opened a footwear store in Bath in the early 1970s. In 2017, the brand re-established its original name, DuoBoots.

In 2012, DuoBoots (then trading under the name Duo) won the Queen's Awards for Enterprise for International Trade 2012

In 2020, the brand was purchased by an American footwear designer.  Today, DuoBoots is based in London and is exclusively online.

References

Footwear